Big Salmon may refer to:

Big Salmon Lake (Ontario), in Frontenac Provincial Park
Big Salmon Range, in the Yukon, Canada

See also
Big Salmon River (disambiguation)